Lafayette Grammar and High School, also known as Lafayette I.O.P. Center, is a historic school complex located at Norfolk, Virginia. The grammar school was built in 1905, and is a two-story brick building in the Colonial Revival style. It has a slate covered hipped roof and arched window openings.  The high school was built in 1910, and is a two-story brick building connected to the grammar school.  The school was abandoned in 1970.

It was listed on the National Register of Historic Places in 1983.

References

School buildings on the National Register of Historic Places in Virginia
Colonial Revival architecture in Virginia
School buildings completed in 1905
Schools in Norfolk, Virginia
National Register of Historic Places in Norfolk, Virginia
1905 establishments in Virginia